The 1921 Melbourne Cup was a two-mile handicap horse race which took place on Tuesday, 1 November 1921.

This year's Melbourne Cup saw chaos when the favourite Eurythmic got its head above the strand tape and when it was raised mayhem ensued. When the race was run it was won by Sister Olive who became the third and most recent filly to win the Melbourne Cup.

This is the list of placegetters for the 1921 Melbourne Cup.

See also

 Melbourne Cup
 List of Melbourne Cup winners
 Victoria Racing Club

References

1921
Melbourne Cup
Melbourne Cup
20th century in Melbourne
1920s in Melbourne